Kaleidoscope Entertainment Pvt. Ltd. (or KEPL) is an Indian film and television production company. Films produced by them include Bandit Queen, Fire, Electric Moon, Saathiya, Maqbool, American Daylight, and Mangal Pandey: The Rising. Kaleidoscope is regarded as one of the leading production houses in the Indian film and television Industry, and one of the few that have created content that has successfully crossed over to western audiences.

KEPL was launched by independent film producer Bobby Bedi, who remains its owner and Managing Director.

KEPL has worked and is working with some of the finest talent in the Indian Movie industry from Pradeep Krishen Shekhar Kapur, Vishal Bhardwaj, Aamir Khan, Abbas Tyrewala to International Stars such as Nusrat Fateh Ali Khan and A. R. Rahman Arundhati Roy Shah Rukh Khan and beyond.

Kaleidoscope Entertainment has also created the Mahabharata 360 Project, encompassing film, Television, Animation, Gaming and mobile products.

Films

External links
 Kaleidoscope Entertainment Official Site

References

Film production companies of Delhi
Entertainment companies established in 1989
Indian companies established in 1989